In re Quinlan (70 N.J. 10, 355 A.2d 647 (NJ 1976)) was a landmark 1975 court case in the United States in which the parents of a woman who was kept alive by artificial means were allowed to order her removal from artificial ventilation.

Karen Ann Quinlan

Karen Ann Quinlan was 21 years old in 1975. After a night of drinking alcohol and ingesting tranquilizers, Quinlan passed out and ceased breathing for two 15-minute periods. After it was determined that she was in a persistent vegetative state, her father, Joseph Quinlan, wished to remove her from the medical ventilator. Quinlan's primary physician and the hospital both refused.

Legal case
Quinlan's father retained attorneys Paul W. Armstrong, a Morris County, New Jersey, Legal Aid attorney, and James M. Crowley, an associate at the New York City law firm of Shearman & Sterling with degrees in theology and Church law, and filed suit in the New Jersey Superior Court in Morris County, New Jersey, on September 12, 1975, to be appointed as Quinlan's legal guardian so that he could act on her behalf. Armstrong would later become involved in the Nancy Cruzan case and later still become a judge. Crowley is, as of 2017, legal counsel and advisor to several Vatican-related entities.

The Court denied his request on November 10, 1975. Joseph Quinlan appealed the decision to the Supreme Court of New Jersey, which on March 31, 1976, held that he could authorize the cessation of ventilation; and that Saint Clare's Hospital was bound to proceed with this order.

Aftermath
After being removed from the ventilator, Quinlan continued to breathe until her death, in 1985, from pneumonia.

The autopsy of Quinlan's brain found extensive damage to the bilateral thalamus.

See also
 Betancourt v. Trinitas Hospital: another New Jersey case on end of life care

References

External links
 Full text of decision 

New Jersey state case law
1976 in United States case law
1976 in New Jersey
Morris County, New Jersey
Medical controversies in the United States
Euthanasia in the United States
Euthanasia law